The 2022 Australian Darts Open was the second edition of the Australian Darts Open organised by Darts Australia. The tournament was held at the Moama Bowling Club in Moama, Australia. Australian Darts Open has been added to the WDF calendar and has been awarded Platinum ranking status, with a total prize fund of A$80,000.

Damon Heta who won the previous men's tournament was absent from the event, having switched to the Professional Darts Corporation in January 2020. Lisa Ashton was defending the women's title as one of the seeded players, but lost in the group-stage match to Nicole Regnaud from New Zealand.

Raymond Smith became the new men's champion and Beau Greaves became the new women's champion.

Prize money

Men's

Format and qualifiers
Qualifying criteria is as follows:

 2022 Lakeside Men's World Champion (seeded)
 Two best players from World men's ranking (seeded)
 Three best players from Australia men's ranking (seeded)
 Two best players from New Zealand men's ranking (seeded)
 Eight qualifiers from the state qualifiers (Australian Capital Territory, New South Wales, Northern Territory, Queensland, South Australia, Tasmania, Victoria, Western Australia)
 Eight qualifiers from open qualification tournaments in Moama, Australia on 3–4 August 2022

The final 24 men will be drawn into groups of 3 and will compete upon the stage.

Seeded players
  (semi-finals)
  (quarter-finals)
  (runner-up)
  (champion)
  (quarter-finals)
  (group stage)
  (group stage)
  (quarter-finals)

State qualifiers
  (group stage)
  (group stage)
  (group stage)
  (group stage)
  (group stage)
  (group stage)
  (group stage)
  (group stage)

Open qualifiers
  (group stage)
  (quarter-finals)
  (semi-finals)
  (group stage)
  (group stage)
  (group stage)
  (group stage)
  (group stage)

Group stage
All group matches are best of nine legs  Only winners in each group qualify for the knock-out stage

NB: P = Played; W = Won; L = Lost; LF = Legs for; LA = Legs against;  = Plus/minus record, in relation to legs; Pts = Points; Status = Qualified to knockout stage

Source:

Group A

4 August

5 August

Group B

4 August

5 August

Group C

4 August

5 August

Group D

4 August

5 August

Group E

4 August

5 August

Group F

4 August

5 August

Group G

4 August

5 August

Group H

4 August

5 August

Knockout stage

Women's

Format and qualifiers
Qualifying criteria is as follows:

 2022 Lakeside Women's World Champion (seeded)
 Best player from World Women's Ranking (seeded)
 2019 Australian Darts Open finalists (seeded)
 Two best players from Australia Women's Ranking
 Two best players from New Zealand Women's Ranking
 Four qualifiers from open qualification tournaments in Moama, Australia on 3–4 August 2022

The final 12 women will be drawn into groups of 3 and will compete upon the stage.

Seeded players
  (champion)
  (group stage)
  (runner-up)
  (group stage)

Rankings qualifiers
  (semi-finals)
  (group stage)
  (group stage)
  (semi-finals)

Open qualifiers
  (group stage)
  (group stage)
  (group stage)
  (group stage)

Group stage
All group matches are best of seven legs  Only winners in each group qualify for the knock-out stage

NB: P = Played; W = Won; L = Lost; LF = Legs for; LA = Legs against;  = Plus/minus record, in relation to legs; Pts = Points; Status = Qualified to knockout stage

Group A

4 August

5 August

Group B

4 August

5 August

Group C

4 August

5 August

Group D

4 August

5 August

Knockout stage

References

Australian Darts Open
Australian Darts Open
Australian Darts Open
Darts in Australia
Moama
Sport in the Riverina
Sports competitions in New South Wales